Air Canada Flight 143, commonly known as the Gimli Glider, was a Canadian scheduled domestic passenger flight between Montreal and Edmonton that ran out of fuel on Saturday, July 23, 1983, at an altitude of , midway through the flight. The flight crew successfully glided the Boeing 767 to an emergency landing at a former Royal Canadian Air Force base in Gimli, Manitoba, which had been converted to a racetrack, Gimli Motorsports Park. It resulted in no serious injuries to passengers or persons on the ground, and only minor damage to the aircraft. The aircraft was repaired and remained in service until 2008. This unusual aviation incident earned the aircraft the nickname "Gimli Glider".

The incident was caused by a series of issues starting with a failed fuel-quantity indicator sensor (FQIS). These had high failure rates in the 767, and the only available replacement was also nonfunctional. The problem was logged, but later maintenance crew misunderstood the problem and turned off the backup FQIS, as well. This required the fuel to be manually measured using a dripstick. The navigational computer required the fuel to be entered in kilograms, but an incorrect conversion from volume to mass was applied, which led the pilots and ground crew to agree that it was carrying enough fuel for the remaining trip. In fact, the aircraft was carrying only 45% of its required fuel load. The aircraft ran out of fuel halfway to Edmonton, where maintenance staff were waiting to install a working FQIS that they had borrowed from another airline.

The Board of Inquiry found fault with Air Canada procedures, training, and manuals. It recommended the adoption of fueling procedures and other safety measures that were already being used by US and European airlines. The board also recommended the immediate conversion of all Air Canada aircraft from Imperial units to metric units, since a mixed fleet was more dangerous than an all-Imperial or an all-metric fleet.

Today, Air Canada still uses flight number 143, currently for a service to Calgary from its primary hub at Toronto Pearson.

History

Background
On July 22, 1983, Air Canada Boeing 767  underwent routine checks in Edmonton. The technician found a defective FQIS, so he disabled the defective channel and made an entry in the logbook. The next morning, Captain John Weir and co-pilot Captain Donald Johnson were told about the problem. Since the FQIS was operating on a single channel, a dripstick reading was taken to obtain a second measurement of fuel quantity. Weir converted the dripstick reading from centimetres to litres to kilograms, finding that it agreed with the FQIS. The plane flew to Toronto and then Montreal without incident.

At Montreal, Captain Robert "Bob" Pearson and First Officer Maurice Quintal took over the airplane for Flight 143 to Ottawa and Edmonton. During the handover, Weir told Pearson that a problem existed with the FQIS, and Pearson decided to take on enough fuel to fly to Edmonton without refueling in Ottawa. Meanwhile, an avionics technician had entered the cockpit and read the logbook. While waiting for the fuel truck, he enabled the defective channel and performed an FQIS self test. Distracted by the arrival of the fuel truck, he left the channel enabled after the FQIS failed the test. Pearson entered the cockpit to find the FQIS blank, as he expected.

After taking a dripstick measurement, Pearson converted the reading from centimetres to litres to kilograms, but he did his calculation with the density figure for jet fuel in pounds/litre from the Air Canada refueler's slip, used for all other aircraft in the fleet, instead of kilograms/litre for the all-metric 767 aircraft, which was new to the fleet. Since the FQIS was not operational, he entered the reading into the flight management computer, which tracked the amount of fuel remaining in kilograms. The airplane flew to Ottawa without incident, where another dripstick measurement was taken and converted using the density in pounds/litre. Since the aircraft appeared to have enough fuel to reach Edmonton, no fuel was loaded at Ottawa.

Running out of fuel
While Flight 143 was cruising over Red Lake, Ontario, at  shortly after 8 pm CDT, the aircraft's cockpit warning system sounded, indicating a fuel-pressure problem on the aircraft's left side. Assuming that a fuel pump had failed, the pilots turned off the alarm, knowing that the engine could be gravity-fed in level flight. A few seconds later, the fuel pressure alarm also sounded for the right engine. This prompted the pilots to divert to Winnipeg.

Within seconds, the left engine failed and the pilots began preparing for a single-engine landing. As they communicated their intentions to controllers in Winnipeg and tried to restart the left engine, the cockpit warning system sounded again with the "all engines out" sound, a sharp "bong" that no one in the cockpit could recall having heard before. Seconds later, the right-side engine also stopped and the 767 lost all power. Flying with all engines out was never expected to occur, so it had never been covered in training.

The 767 was one of the first airliners to include an electronic flight instrument system, which operated on the electricity generated by the aircraft's jet engines. With both engines stopped, the system went dead and most of the screens went blank, leaving only a few basic battery-powered emergency flight instruments. While these provided sufficient information to land the aircraft, the backup instruments did not include a vertical speed indicator that could be used to determine how far the aircraft could glide.

On the Boeing 767, the control surfaces are so large that the pilots cannot move them with muscle power alone. Instead, hydraulic systems are used to multiply the forces applied by the pilots. Since the engines supply power for the hydraulic systems, in the case of complete power outage, the aircraft was designed with a ram air turbine that swings out from a compartment and drives a hydraulic pump to supply power to hydraulic systems.

Landing at Gimli
In line with their planned diversion to Winnipeg, the pilots had been descending through  when the second engine shut down. They had searched their emergency checklist for the section on flying the aircraft with both engines out, only to find that no such section existed. Captain Pearson was an experienced glider pilot, so he was familiar with flying techniques almost never used in commercial flight. To have the maximum range and therefore the largest choice of possible landing sites, he needed to fly the 767 at the optimum glide speed. First Officer Quintal began to calculate whether they could reach Winnipeg. He used the altitude from one of the mechanical backup instruments, while the distance travelled was supplied by the air traffic controllers in Winnipeg, measured by the aircraft's radar echo observed at Winnipeg. In , the aircraft lost , giving a glide ratio of roughly 12:1 (dedicated glider planes reach ratios of 50:1 to 70:1).

At this point, Quintal proposed landing at the former RCAF Station Gimli, a closed air force base where he had once served as a pilot for the Royal Canadian Air Force. Unbeknownst to Quintal or to the air traffic controller, a part of the facility had been converted to a race track complex, now known as Gimli Motorsports Park. It included a road-race course, a go-kart track, and a dragstrip. A Canadian Automobile Sport Clubs-sanctioned sports-car race hosted by the Winnipeg Sports Car Club was underway at the time of the incident and the area around the decommissioned runway was full of cars and campers. Part of the decommissioned runway was being used to stage the race.

Without main power, the pilots used a gravity drop to lower the landing gear and lock it into place. The main gear locked into position, but the nose wheel did not. The failure of the nose wheel to lock fortuitously turned out to be advantageous after touchdown. As the aircraft slowed on approach to landing, the reduced power generated by the ram air turbine rendered the aircraft increasingly difficult to control.

As the plane approached the runway, the pilots realized it was coming in too high and fast, increasing the likelihood that the 767 would run off the runway. The lack of hydraulic pressure prevented flap/slat extension that would have, under normal conditions, reduced the aircraft's stall speed and increased the lift coefficient of the wings, to slow the airliner for a safe landing. The pilots briefly considered a 360° turn to reduce speed and altitude, but they decided that they did not have enough altitude for the manoeuvre. Pearson decided to execute a side slip to increase drag and reduce altitude. This manoeuvre, performed by "crossing the controls" (applying rudder in one direction and ailerons in the other direction), is commonly used in gliders and light aircraft to descend more quickly without increasing forward speed; it is almost never used in large jet airliners outside of rare circumstances like those of this flight. The forward slip disrupted airflow past the ram air turbine, which decreased the hydraulic power available; the pilots were surprised to find the aircraft slow to respond when straightening after the forward slip.

With both of its engines dead, the plane made hardly any noise during its approach. This gave people on the ground no warning of the impromptu landing and little time to flee. As the gliding plane closed in on the decommissioned runway, the pilots noticed two boys were riding bicycles within  of the projected point of impact. Captain Pearson later said that the boys were so close that he could see the looks of sheer terror on their faces as they realized that a large aircraft was bearing down on them.

Two factors helped avert disaster; the failure of the front landing gear to lock into position during the gravity drop and the presence of a guardrail that had been installed along the centre of the repurposed runway to facilitate its use as a drag race track. As soon as the wheels touched down on the runway, Pearson braked hard, skidding and promptly blowing out two of the aircraft's tires. The unlocked nose wheel collapsed and was forced back into its well, causing the aircraft's nose to slam into, bounce off, and then scrape along the ground. This additional friction helped to slow the airplane and kept it from crashing into the crowds surrounding the runway. Pearson applied extra right brake, which caused the main landing gear to straddle the guardrail. Air Canada Flight 143 came to a final stop on the ground 17 minutes after running out of fuel.

No serious injuries occurred among the 61 passengers or the people on the ground. As the aircraft's nose had collapsed onto the ground, its tail was elevated, so some minor injuries happened when passengers exited the aircraft via the rear slides, which were not sufficiently long to accommodate the increased height. A minor fire in the nose area was extinguished by racers and course workers equipped with portable fire extinguishers.

Investigation
The Aviation Safety Board of Canada (predecessor of the modern Transportation Safety Board of Canada) reported that Air Canada management was responsible for "corporate and equipment deficiencies". Their report praised the flight and cabin crews for their "professionalism and skill". It noted that Air Canada "neglected to assign clearly and specifically the responsibility for calculating the fuel load in an abnormal situation." It further found that the airline had failed to reallocate the task of checking fuel load (which had been the responsibility of the flight engineer on older aircraft flown with a crew of three). The safety board also said that Air Canada needed to keep more spare parts, including replacements for the defective fuel quantity indicator, in its maintenance inventory, as well as provide better, more thorough training on the metric system to its pilots and fuelling personnel. The final report of the investigation was published in April 1985.

Fuel-quantity indication system
The amount of fuel in the tanks of a Boeing 767 is computed by the FQIS and displayed in the cockpit. The FQIS on the aircraft was a dual-processor channel, each independently calculating the fuel load and cross-checking with the other. In the event of one failing, the other could still operate alone, but in that case, the indicated quantity was required to be cross-checked against a floatstick measurement before departure. In the event of both channels failing, no fuel display was seen in the cockpit, and the aircraft would be considered unserviceable and not authorized to fly.

Because inconsistencies had been found with the FQIS in other 767s, Boeing had issued a service bulletin for the routine checking of this system. An engineer in Edmonton duly did so when the aircraft arrived from Toronto following a trouble-free flight the day before the incident. While conducting this check, the FQIS failed and the cockpit fuel gauges went blank. The engineer had encountered the same problem earlier in the month when this same aircraft had arrived from Toronto with an FQIS fault. He found then that disabling the second channel by pulling the circuit breaker in the cockpit restored the fuel gauges to working order albeit with only the single FQIS channel operative. In the absence of any spares, he simply repeated this temporary fix by pulling and tagging the circuit breaker.

A record of all actions and findings was made in the maintenance log, including the entry: "SERVICE CHK – FOUND FUEL QTY IND BLANK – FUEL QTY #2 C/B PULLED & TAGGED...". This reports that the fuel gauges were blank and that the second FQIS channel was disabled, but does not make clear that the latter fixed the former.

On the day of the incident, the aircraft flew from Edmonton to Montreal. Before departure, the engineer informed the pilot of the problem and confirmed that the tanks would have to be verified with a floatstick. In a misunderstanding, the pilot believed that the aircraft had been flown with the fault from Toronto the previous afternoon. The flight to Montreal proceeded uneventfully with fuel gauges operating correctly on the single channel.

On arrival at Montreal, the crew changed for the return flight to Edmonton. The outgoing pilot informed Captain Pearson and First Officer Quintal of the problem with the FQIS and passed along his mistaken belief that the aircraft had flown the previous day with this problem. In a further misunderstanding, Captain Pearson believed that he was also being told that the FQIS had been completely unserviceable since then.

While the aircraft was being prepared for its return to Edmonton, a maintenance worker decided to investigate the problem with the faulty FQIS. To test the system, he re-enabled the second channel, at which point the fuel gauges in the cockpit went blank. Before he could disable the second channel again, however, he was called away to perform a floatstick measurement of fuel remaining in the tanks, leaving the circuit breaker tagged (which masked the fact that it was no longer pulled). The FQIS was now completely unserviceable and the fuel gauges were blank.

On entering the cockpit, Captain Pearson saw what he was expecting to see - blank fuel gauges and a tagged circuit breaker. Pearson consulted the master minimum equipment list (MMEL), which indicated that the aircraft was not legal to fly with blank fuel gauges, but due to a misunderstanding, Pearson believed that it was safe to fly if the amount of fuel was confirmed with measuring sticks.

The 767 was still a very new aircraft, having flown its maiden flight in September 1981. C-GAUN was the 47th Boeing 767 off the production line, and had been delivered to Air Canada less than four months previously. In that time, 55 changes had been made to the MMEL, and some pages were blank pending development of procedures.

Because of this unreliability, flights being authorized by maintenance personnel had become standard practice. To add to his own misconceptions about the condition in which the aircraft had been flying since the previous day, reinforced by what he saw in the cockpit, Pearson now had a signed-off maintenance log, which had become customarily preferred over the MMEL.

Miscalculation during fueling 
In older aircraft that flew with a three-person crew, the flight engineer kept a fuel log and supervised the fueling. The Boeing 767 belonged to a new generation of aircraft that flew with only a pilot and co-pilot, but Air Canada had not clearly assigned responsibility for supervising the fueling. On the day of the accident, two technicians and two pilots worked on the calculation in Montreal. One technician stopped after he found that he was not making any progress. Another technician was using a piece of paper that he had in his pocket, and he stopped when he ran out of space. First Officer Quintal did the calculation by hand, and Captain Pearson checked the arithmetic with his Jeppesen slide rule.

Since the FQIS was not working, Captain Pearson decided to take on enough fuel to reach Edmonton without refueling at Ottawa. The flight plan showed that  of fuel were required for the flight from Montreal to Ottawa to Edmonton. A dripstick check found that  of fuel were already in the tanks. To calculate how much fuel the airplane had to take on, he needed to convert the 7682litres of fuel already in the tanks to their equivalent mass in kilograms, subtract that figure from the 22,300 kg total fuel that would be needed, and convert that result back into its equivalent volume. The density in metric units was 0.803 kg/L, so the correct calculation would have been:

7,682 L × 0.803 kg/L = 6,169 kg = mass of fuel already on board
22,300 kg − 6,169 kg = 16,131 kg = mass of additional fuel required, or
16,131 kg ÷ (0.803 kg/L) = 20,088 L = volume of additional fuel required

At the time of the incident, Canada's aviation sector was in the process of converting from Imperial to metric units. As part of this process, the new 767s being acquired by Air Canada were the first to be calibrated for metric units. The fueler reported that the density of jet fuel at the time was 1.77, which was in lb/L, since other Air Canada aircraft used lb. Pearson and Quintal both used the density of jet fuel in lb/L without converting to kg/L:

7,682 L × 1.77 lb/L = 13,597 lb = misinterpreted as kilograms of fuel already on board
22,300 kg − 13,597 kg = 8,703 kg = incorrect mass of additional fuel required
8,703 kg ÷ (1.77 lb/L) = 4,917 L·kg/lb = misinterpreted as litres of additional fuel required

Instead of taking on the 20,088 L of additional fuel that they required, they took on only 4,917 L. The use of the incorrect conversion factor led to a total fuel load of only  rather than the  that were needed. This was less than half of the amount required to reach their destination.

The flight management computer (FMC) measures fuel consumption, allowing the crew to keep track of fuel burned as the flight progresses. It is normally updated automatically by the FQIS, but the fuel quantity can also be entered manually. Because the FMC would reset during the stopover in Ottawa, the captain had the fuel tanks measured again with the dripstick. With 11,430 litres of fuel in the tanks, the fueler gave the density as 1.78. Repeating the same error, Captain Pearson determined that he had  of fuel and entered this number into the FMC. However, he actually had just  of fuel.

The previous flight from Edmonton to Montreal had avoided the error. The fueler at Edmonton knew the density of jet fuel in kg/L, and he calculated the correct number of litres to pump into the tanks. He testified that it was a "regular practice of his" to do such calculations. When fueling was complete, Captains Weir and Johnson checked the figures. The captain knew "from previous experience" the density of jet fuel in kg/L. He also had a working FQIS, which agreed with his calculations.

Aftermath
Following Air Canada's internal investigation, Captain Pearson was demoted for six months, and First Officer Quintal was suspended for two weeks for allowing the incident to happen. Three maintenance workers were also suspended. In 1985, Pearson and Quintal were awarded the first ever Fédération Aéronautique Internationale Diploma for Outstanding Airmanship. Several attempts by other crews who were given the same circumstances in a simulator at Vancouver resulted in crashes. Quintal was promoted to captain in 1989. Pearson remained with Air Canada for 10 years and then moved to flying for Asiana Airlines; he retired in 1995. Maurice Quintal died at the age of 68 on September 24, 2015, in Saint-Donat, Quebec.

The aircraft was temporarily repaired at Gimli, and flew out two days later to be fully repaired at a maintenance base in Winnipeg. Following the full repair, the aircraft was returned to service with Air Canada. Following a successful appeal against their suspensions, Pearson and Quintal were assigned as crew members aboard another Air Canada flight.

The 1995 television movie Falling from the Sky: Flight 174 is loosely based on this event.

The Discovery Channel Canada / National Geographic TV series Mayday covered the incident in a 2008 episode titled "Gimli Glider". The episode featured interviews with survivors, including Pearson and Quintal, and a dramatic recreation of the flight.

Retirement

After almost 25 years of service, C-GAUN flew its last revenue flight on January 1, 2008. On January 24, 2008, the Gimli Glider took its final voyage, AC7067, from Montreal Trudeau to Tucson International Airport before flying to its retirement in the Mojave Desert in California.

Flight AC7067 was captained by Jean-Marc Bélanger, a former head of the Air Canada Pilots Association, while captains Robert Pearson and Maurice Quintal were on board to oversee the flight from Montreal to California's Mojave Airport. Also on board were three of the six flight attendants who were on Flight 143.

On July 23, 2008, the 25th anniversary of the incident, pilots Pearson and Quintal were celebrated in a parade in Gimli, and a mural was dedicated to commemorate the landing.

However, bidding only reached  and the lot was unsold.

According to a website dedicated to saving the aircraft, the Gimli Glider was scrapped in early 2014.

In June 2017, a permanent museum exhibit of the event opened in Gimli.

See also
 List of airline flights that required gliding

References

Further reading

 Emergency, Crisis on the Flight Deck, Stanley Stewart, Airlife Publishing Ltd., 1992, 
 Freefall: From 41,000 feet to zero – a true story, William and Marilyn Hoffer, Simon & Schuster, 1989 
 Engineering Disasters – Lessons to be Learned, Don Lawson, ASME Press, 2005, pp. 221–29 deal specifically with Gimli Glider.

External links
 The Official Gimli Glider Project website
 Damn Interesting: The Gimli Glider
 CBC Digital Archives: 'Gimli Glider' lands without fuel
 Photo of C-GAUN after the landing
 Picture of C-GAUN in storage (airliners.net)
 

1983 in Canada
Airliner accidents and incidents caused by fuel exhaustion
Airliner accidents and incidents in Canada
Aviation in Manitoba
Airliner accidents and incidents caused by pilot error
Metrication in Canada
Individual aircraft
Aviation accidents and incidents in 1983
Accidents and incidents involving the Boeing 767
Air Canada accidents and incidents
1983 in Manitoba
July 1983 events in Canada
Gimli, Manitoba